Siah Moghan-e Bala (also Romanized as Sīāh Moghān-e Bālā and Sīāh Maghān-e Bālā; also known as Seyān Moghān and Sīāh Moghān) is a village in Rahdar Rural District, in the Central District of Rudan County, Hormozgan Province, Iran. At the 2006 census, its population was 74, in 17 families.

References 

Populated places in Rudan County